The 2014–15 Youngstown State Penguins men's basketball team represented Youngstown State University during the 2014–15 NCAA Division I men's basketball season. The Penguins, led by tenth year head coach Jerry Slocum, played their home games at the Beeghly Center and were members of the Horizon League. They finished the season 11–21, 2–14 in Horizon League play to finish in last place. They lost in the first round of the Horizon League tournament to Detroit.

Roster

Schedule

|-
!colspan=9 style="background:#FF0000; color:#FFFFFF;"| Regular season

|-
!colspan=9 style="background:#FF0000; color:#FFFFFF;"| Horizon League tournament

References

Youngstown State Penguins men's basketball seasons
Youngstown
2014 in sports in Ohio
2015 in sports in Ohio